iFood is a Brazilian online food ordering and food delivery platform, operating in Brazil and Colombia. The company holds over 80% market share of the food delivery sector in Brazil. It is owned by Dutch-based Prosus (part of Naspers) and its Brazilian investment firm Movile.

It merged its businesses in Argentina and Colombia with rivals PedidosYa in August 2018 and Domicilios.com in March 2021 respectively, brands of Delivery Hero which is also owned by Prosus. It operated as SinDelantal in Mexico until December 2020.

History 
iFood was founded in 2011 by Patrick Sigrist, Guilherme Bonifacio, Eduardo Baer and Felipe Fioravante. Movile owns iFood as a subsidiary, with Just Eat owning a 33% stake in iFood until 2022. Naspers provided funding when iFood had just started.

It serves customers in Brazil and Mexico. It connected 15,000 restaurants to customers who collectively placed four million orders every month in 2018. iFood had £123.8m in sales, making it 16 times larger than the next largest delivery company in the region in 2018. iFood has 80% of the market share in Brazil of food deliveries and according to the book Business Despite Borders, "iFood became a synonym of food delivery in Brazil." 

In August 2018, PedidosYa acquired the Argentinian business. In March 2021 the merger of the Colombian subsidiary with PedidosYa was approved.

On 19 August 2022, Just Eat Takeaway.com sold its 33% stake in iFood to Prosus for €1.8 billion. This follows years of talks of Just Eat Takeaway selling their share in the company since 2020.

References

External links 
 Official website

2011 establishments in Brazil
Companies based in São Paulo
Internet properties established in 2011
Online food ordering
Brazilian brands